Coptosia kubani is a species of beetle in the family Cerambycidae. It was described by Holzschuh in 1991. It is known from Tajikistan.

References

Saperdini
Beetles described in 1991